Olivier Chavy  is a French hotelier.

The Board of Directors of the international Swiss hospitality company Mövenpick Hotels & Resorts appointed Olivier Chavy as CEO in September 2016. Chavy took over leadership of the group from Jean-Gabriel Pérès.

Prior to this Olivier Chavy was the CEO/President of Wilson Associates, an interior design firm headquartered in Dallas, Texas, since 2013.

Biography

Olivier Chavy started his career within French Group Lucien Barriere, for which he served as general manager of several luxury hotels, including Hotel Normandy Deauville 5* (aged 27) and Hotel Hermitage La Baule 5*.

In 2000, he joined the Hilton Hotels Corporation, serving as general manager of the Hilton Mauritius Resort & Spa, and later general manager of the Hilton Arc de Triomphe in Paris (512 rooms, 400 employees).

In 2007, Olivier Chavy left Europe for Florida, joining Hilton's Hilton Grand Vacations brand, for which he supervised the global resorts operations (Senior Vice President).

In 2010, he headed the Lifestyle & Luxury Brands of Hilton Worldwide in Asia, Europe, Middle East and Africa, including the Conrad brand and The Waldorf=Astoria Collection (more than 50 luxury hotels in these regions).

In 2019, Chavy was appointed President of RCI.

He holds BA in Hotel Management from École Hôtelière de Saint-Quentin-En-Yvelines, a post-graduate diploma from ESSEC Business School in Paris, and an MBA from Cornell University.

Chavy also serves on multiple boards including the French Foreign Trade Advisory Board - CCEF and The University of Central Florida's Rosen College of Hospitality Management.

References

Living people
French hoteliers
ESSEC Business School alumni
Year of birth missing (living people)